The House Subcommittee on Commodity Markets, Digital Assets, and Rural Development is a subcommittee within the House Agriculture Committee.  It was previously known as the subcommittee on Commodity Exchanges, Energy, and Credit, but lost jurisdiction over agricultural credit at the 118th Congress.

It is currently chaired by Democrat Antonio Delgado of New York and its Ranking Member is Republican Michelle Fischbach of Minnesota.

Jurisdiction 
Policies, statutes, and markets relating to commodity exchanges; rural development; energy; rural electrification; and related oversight of such issues.

History
The subcommittee was formerly known as the Subcommittee on Conservation, Credit, Rural Development and Research prior to the 110th Congress when rural development issues and several other of its responsibilities, such as farm security and family farming matters, plant pests and pesticides, and biotechnology were transferred to other subcommittees. Energy was also added to the subcommittee's title to reflect the committee's continued oversight over the federal Rural Electrification program and the increases development and use of biofuels in the United States. 

At the start of the 112th Congress, the subcommittee gained jurisdiction over forestry issues from the Department Operations, Oversight, Nutrition and Forestry and was renamed Subcommittee on Conservation, Energy, and Forestry.

At the start of the 114th Congress, the subcommittee was again renamed and its jurisdictional purview changed.

Members, 118th Congress

Historical membership rosters

117th Congress

116th Congress

115th Congress

References

External links
 Subcommittee page

Agriculture Conservation, Credit, and Forestry